Maliçan (romanized: Máltsiani) is a small village in Vlorë County, southern Albania. At the 2015 local government reform it became part of the municipality of Finiq. It is inhabited solely by Greeks.

History 
The village has around 16 churches (most ruined), with the most known being the Church of Panagia, dating back to the end of the 16th century. Also Stavrianos Vistiaris is believed to be born in Maltsiani, in the 16th or 17th century.

In the late 19th century, the village belonged to the kaza of Delvinë. In April 1944 the village was burned by the Germans.

Demographics 
According to Ottoman statistics, the village had 148 inhabitants in 1895. The village had 295 inhabitants in 1993, all ethnically Greeks.

References

External links 
The 16th century Greek-Orthodox Church of Maltsiani
Video showing the village

Villages in Vlorë County
Greek communities in Albania